Nick Carter va tout casser  is a French action film starring Eddie Constantine as Nick Carter. An English version was dubbed by Eddie Constantine dubbing himself. Constantine repeated his role in Nick Carter et le trèfle rouge (1965). The film was titled License to Kill in the USA.

Synopsis 
Professor Fromentin's inventions are about to start a new era in anti-aircraft warfare. No fighter aircraft hitherto known stands a chance against his trail-blazing self-designed unmanned aerial vehicles. Secret services all over the world are determined to either obtain Fromentin's knowledge or to make dead sure nobody else does. But Fromentin refuses to sell and consequently several attempts are made on his life.

Nick Carter has a personal interest in protecting the professor who was a good friend of his father. This is harder than it looks because the professor's entourage includes at least one traitor.

An international network of terrorists eventually conceives a plan to take advantage of this situation. They intend to capture the professor and then to sell him to the highest bidder. Nick Carter has to apply advanced gadgets and sometimes also just his fists, thus refuting all criminal tactics until the scientist can continue searching in freedom and peace.

Cast 
 Eddie Constantine: Nick Carter
 Paul Frankeur:  Antonio
 :  Catherine
 Yvonne Monlaur:  Mireille
 Valéry Inkijinoff:  Li-Hang
 André Valmy:  Daumale
 :  Bruno
 Yves Rousselin:  Colibri
 Jean-Paul Moulinot:  Fromentin
 :  Gladys
 Margo Lion:  Marie-Jeanne

Reception
David Deal states in the "Eurospy Guide" that this film emulated the US-American Nick Carter movies "of  the 1930s and 1940s" and subsequently he recommends it to nostalgist with a penchant for "serials of pulp magazines" of that era.

Bibliography

References

External links
 
 
Nick Carter va tout casser at "Fantastic Movie Musings and Ramblings"

1964 films
1960s spy thriller films
French spy thriller films
1960s spy action films
French spy action films
Films directed by Henri Decoin
Nick Carter (literary character)
1960s French films